Settlement date is a securities industry term describing the date on which a trade (bonds, equities, foreign exchange, commodities, etc.) settles. That is, the actual day on which transfer of cash or assets is completed and is usually a few days after the trade was done.  The number of days between trade date and settlement date depends on the security and the convention in the market it was traded.  For example when settling a share transaction on the London Stock Exchange this is set at trade date + 2 business days. In USA, the transfer period was changed from 3 to 2 days in 2017.

It is not necessarily the same as value date (when the settlement amount is calculated). For instance, the back office may require a few days to make payment. This gap (between valuation and settlement) is often written into the financial contract, although the actual settlement date can also differ from that originally specified because of problems or errors.

It is occasionally referred to as "contractual settlement date".

See also
Trade date
Spot date
Value date
Settlement (finance)
Herstatt Risk/Settlement risk
T+2

References

  Settlement Date defined as the actual date of completion (page 251).
 investorwords.com  defines "settlement date" as the last possible date of intended settlement. Accessed October 12, 2007.

Securities (finance)
Bond valuation
Swaps (finance)
Settlement (finance)